Bernice is an unincorporated community in rural Washington Township, Tuscarawas County, Ohio, United States. It is located on State Route 258 outside Newcomerstown. It is intersected by Washington Township's Dog and Sleepy Elm roads. Dunlap Creek, a tributary of the Tuscarawas River, flows through Bernice.

References

Unincorporated communities in Tuscarawas County, Ohio
Unincorporated communities in Ohio